One Night Stand is a Canadian music television series which aired on CBC Television in 1976.

Premise
This series featured Toronto concerts in the rock and pop genres, presented by either Rob Parker and Mel Profit who alternated as episode hosts. Featured artists included Dianne Heatherington, Joe Mendelson of Mainline, Domenic Troiano Band and the Christopher Ward Band.

John Martin, later of MuchMusic, produced One Night Stand.

Scheduling
This half-hour series was broadcast on Saturdays at 7:00 p.m. (Eastern) from 17 April to 26 June 1976, with two final broadcasts aired Fridays at 7:00 p.m. on 10 and 17 September 1976.

References

External links
 

CBC Television original programming
1976 Canadian television series debuts
1976 Canadian television series endings